Ismaël Ferroukhi (born 26 June 1962) is a French-Moroccan film director and screenwriter.

Ferroukhi was born in Kenitra. He gained exposure with his 1992 short film L'Exposé, which won the Kodak Prize at the 1993 Cannes Film Festival. Following, Ferroukhi co-wrote the Cédric Kahn film Trop de bonheur (1994).  

His directorial debut Le Grand Voyage, produced by Humbert Balsan and Ognon Pictures, won the Lion of the Future "Luigi De Laurentiis" Award for a First Feature Film at the 61st Venice Film Festival in 2004.

Filmography

Awards and nominations
L'Exposé (1993) (Kodak Short Film Award, 1993 Cannes Film Festival)
Le Grand Voyage (2004) (Nomination: Golden Star, Marrakech International Film Festival)
Le Grand Voyage (2004) (Luigi De Laurentiis Award, Venice Film Festival)
Le Grand Voyage (2005) (Best Film, Mar del Plata Film Festival)
Le Grand Voyage (2006) (Nomination: BAFTA Award for Best Film Not in the English Language)

References

External links

1962 births
Living people
French people of Moroccan descent
Moroccan film directors
French film directors
Moroccan screenwriters
French screenwriters
People from Kenitra